AFB may refer to:

 Armed Forces Bank, a US-based financial institution for military members and families
 Armed Forces Bikers, a UK-based motorcycle charity to assist former members of the armed forces
 Acid-fast bacilli
 Air Force Base
 Air Force Brat (children of Air Force personnel)
 American Farm Bureau
 American flatbow, a style of bow used in archery
 American foulbrood, a honeybee disease
 American Foundation for the Blind
 Spoken Gulf Arabic (SIL code)
 AFB, the forward-backward asymmetry